Dina Marie Fisher, known professionally as Dina Eastwood, is an American reporter, news anchor, and actress. She is the former wife of actor and film director Clint Eastwood.

She co-hosted the hidden camera television series Candid Camera (2001–2004) and starred in E!'s reality television series Mrs. Eastwood & Company (2012), that chronicled her life.

Early life and education 
Dina Marie Ruiz was born in Castro Valley, California, the daughter of Michael Ruiz, a Math Teacher at Mission San Jose High School and Wrestling Coach, who had been adopted by a Spanish/Puerto Rican couple as an infant in the Kalihi neighborhood of Honolulu. Michael Ruiz's biological mother, Lilian, was Hawaiian and Japanese and his biological father, Marcus Grant, was African American and Native Hawaiian.[5] her mother  was Mary Lou Ruiz and is of German, Irish and English descent. Michael and Mary were 19 and 21 years old when they had Dina.  Dina grew up in Fremont, California, with her father teaching school in Fresno.

After graduating from Mission San Jose High School in Fremont, she attended several colleges beginning with Ohlone College, a community college in her hometown, in 1983. While a student at Ohlone, she anchored Newsline for Ohlone College Television. She briefly attended Arizona State University in Tempe, and in 1988, graduated from San Francisco State University with a Bachelor's degree in Broadcast Communications. In 2017, she earned a master's degree in creative writing from San Jose State University.

Career 
In 1990, she was hired as a reporter for KNAZ-TV in Flagstaff, Arizona, and eventually became news anchor. In January 1991, she was hired as a news anchor at KSBW in the Monterey-Salinas, California market. She held that position until November 1997. She has since made guest appearances on Action News and at KSBW's Share Your Holiday events. In 1998, she was host of the television show A Quest for Excellence, produced by the California Teachers Association and featuring students, teachers, and administrators and their daily challenges, as well as celebrity interviews. She co-hosted the hidden camera television show Candid Camera with Peter Funt from 2001 to 2004.

Beginning February 8, 2011, announced as Dina Ruiz-Eastwood, and billed on-air as Dina Eastwood, she "guest-anchored for KSBW" the 5 p.m. newscast with weeknight anchor Dan Green. She returned to anchor the 5 pm newscast for two weeks starting November 11, 2013.

Ruiz Eastwood was featured in the San Francisco State University's 2009 "Alumni Hot Shots" list.

She discovered the South African a cappella band Overtone during the filming of her husband's movie Invictus. The band then recorded songs that were used in the Malpaso Productions soundtrack.

Eastwood made brief appearances as a reporter in two of her husband's films, True Crime (1999) and Blood Work (2002). In 2012, she played the role of Vanessa Reeve in The Forger alongside her stepson, Scott Eastwood.

Eastwood joined The California Museum for History, Women and the Arts Board of Trustees and is a past chair. She has been a regular contributor for Carmel magazine since 2010, and a non-fiction editor to literary journal Reed Magazine. She has also worked as a yoga instructor.

Personal life 
She met actor and director Clint Eastwood in 1992, when she interviewed him for KSBW-TV. As Clint Eastwood recalled in 2007,
They married on March 31, 1996. The couple has one daughter, Morgan Eastwood (born December 12, 1996).

In April 2013, Dina Eastwood entered rehab in Arizona, with People magazine writing that "the reported cause was stress".

In August 2013, she stated that she and Clint Eastwood had been living separately for an undisclosed length of time. Dina Eastwood filed for divorce on October 22, 2013.

In July 2016, Dina Eastwood married basketball coach Scott Fisher.

Filmography

References

External links 

 

African-American actresses
African-American journalists
Journalists from California
African-American television personalities
American film actresses
American writers of Japanese descent
American people of English descent
American people of German descent
American people of Irish descent
American people of Native Hawaiian descent
Arizona State University alumni
Eastwood family
Hispanic and Latino American actresses
Living people
Participants in American reality television series
People from Fremont, California
Ohlone College alumni
San Francisco State University alumni
People from Carmel-by-the-Sea, California
American women television journalists
21st-century African-American people
21st-century African-American women
20th-century African-American people
20th-century African-American women
Year of birth missing (living people)